Dirce Migliaccio (30 September 1933 – 22 September 2009) was a Brazilian actress and sister of actor Flávio Migliaccio. Her films include My Home Is Copacabana and She also portraying the character Emília in Sítio do Picapau Amarelo in 1977.

Films
 1962  The Beggars
 1962  O Assalto ao Trem Pagador
 1965  Mitt hem är Copacabana
 1965  Pluft, o Fantasminha
 1975  Conjugal Warfare
 1975  O Roubo das Calcinhas
 1975  O Caçador Fantasma
 1986  Baixo Gávea
 1998  Simão, o Fantasma Trapalhão
 2000  Célia e Rosita
 2001  Bufo & Spallanzani
 2007  Sem Controle
 2007 Xuxa em Sonho de Menina

Series
 1975 Pluft, o Fantasminha
 1977 Sítio do Picapau Amarelo
 2004 Da Cor do Pecado
 2006 Sítio do Picapau Amarelo

References

External links

1933 births
2009 deaths
Brazilian film actresses
20th-century Brazilian actresses
21st-century Brazilian actresses